Zelyony Ostrov is a rural locality (a settlement) in Tsvetnovsky Selsoviet of Volodarsky District, Astrakhan Oblast, Russia. The population was 171 as of 2010. There are 3 streets.

Geography 
Zelyony Ostrov is located 32 km southeast of Volodarsky (the district's administrative centre) by road. Tsvetnoye is the nearest rural locality.

References 

Rural localities in Volodarsky District, Astrakhan Oblast